Pseudomonas thivervalensis is a Gram-negative soil bacterium that infects the roots of Arabidopsis thaliana. Based on 16S rRNA analysis, P. thivervalensis falls within the P. fluorescens group. It derives its name from the fact that it was first isolated in Thiverval, France.

References

External links
Type strain of Pseudomonas thivervalensis at BacDive -  the Bacterial Diversity Metadatabase

Pseudomonadales
Bacteria described in 2000